Aptazapine (developmental code name CGS-7525A) is a tetracyclic antidepressant (TeCA) that was assayed in clinical trials for the treatment of depression in the 1980s but was never marketed. It is a potent α2-adrenergic receptor antagonist with ~10x the strength of the related compound mianserin and has also been shown to act as a 5-HT2 receptor antagonist and H1 receptor inverse agonist, while having no significant effects on the reuptake of serotonin or norepinephrine. Based on its pharmacological profile, aptazapine may be classified as a noradrenergic and specific serotonergic antidepressant (NaSSA).

See also
 Mianserin
 Mirtazapine
 Setiptiline

References

External links

Abandoned drugs
Alpha-2 blockers
H1 receptor antagonists
Noradrenergic and specific serotonergic antidepressants
Serotonin receptor antagonists
Tetracyclic antidepressants